José Sanchis can refer to:
José Sanchís y Ferrandis (archbishop), archbishop of Tarragona 1346–1357
José Sanchís y Ferrandis (bishop), bishop of Segorbe 1673–1679
José Sanchís Bergón, first president of Organización Médica Colegial de España (1921)
José Sanchis Grau (1932–2011), Spanish comic book writer
José Sanchis Sinisterra (born 1940), Spanish playwright and theatre director
José Salvador Sanchis, Spanish cyclist, participated in Cycling at the 1984 Summer Olympics – Men's individual road race, 1985, 1986, 1987 and 1988 Tour de France